Treasure Girl is a musical with a book by Fred Thompson and Vincent Lawrence, music by George Gershwin and lyrics by Ira Gershwin.  The musical's best-known song is "(I've Got a) Crush on You", which has been recorded by a number of artists, including Frank Sinatra.

After a tryout in Philadelphia beginning on October 15, 1928, the musical opened on Broadway at the Alvin Theatre on November 8, 1928.  It ran for 68 performances before closing on January 5, 1929.  It starred Gertrude Lawrence and featured Clifton Webb and Walter Catlett.  Bertram Harrison directed, and Bobby Connelly choreographed.  The critics praised the lyrics and some of the music but found the book "remorselessly dull".

Musical numbers

Act 1
"Skull and Bones" – Ensemble
"(I've Got a) Crush on You" – Polly Tees, "Nat" McNally and Ensemble
"Oh, So Nice!" – Ann Wainwright and Neil Forrester
"According to Mr. Grimes" – Mortimer Grimes and Ensemble
"Place in the Country" – Neil Forrester, Bunce and Girls
"K-ra-zy for You" – "Nat" McNally, Polly Tees and Girls
"I Don't Think I'll Fall in Love Today" – Ann Wainwright and Neil Forrester
"I've Got a Rainbow" – Larry Hopkins, Jack Wrigley, Mary Grimes, Betty, Madge, Kitty and Girls
"Feeling I'm Falling" – Ann Wainwright and Neil Forrester

Act 2
"Treasure Island" – Ensemble
"What Causes That?" – Polly Tees, "Nat" McNally and Girls
"What Are We Here For?" – Ann Wainwright, "Nat" McNally and Girls
"I've Got a Rainbow (Reprise)" – Girls
"Where's the Boy? (Here's the Girl!)" – Ann Wainwright and Boys

Note: The song "A-Hunting We Will Go" was cut from the production.

Roles and original cast
Charles Barron as Jack Wrigley
Walter Catlett as Larry Hopkins
Norman Curtis as Bunce
John Dunsmure as "Slug" Bullard
Stephen Francis as First Mate
Virginia Franck as Madge
Paul Frawley as Neil Forrester
Victor Garland as Arthur
Ferris Hartman as Mortimer Grimes
Mary Hay as Polly Tees
Dorothy Jordan as Betty
Gertrude Lawrence as Ann Wainwright
Gertrude McDonald as Mary Grimes
Peggy O'Neill as Kitty
Edwin Preble as Postman
Clifton Webb as "Nat" McNally

References

External links

Recording of songs from Treasure Girl

1928 musicals
Broadway musicals
Musicals by George and Ira Gershwin